= Discrimination against LGBTQ people in Southeast Asia =

Discrimination against LGBTQ+ individuals is defined as the enactment of policies as well as negative behaviours against a group of people based on the fact that they identify with the LGBTQ+ community.

Prejudice against the LGBTQ+ community is often the consequence of stigmas, such as people pathologising attraction to people of the same gender, and heteronormative values, for example, believing that all people should find a spouse of the opposite gender and build a family with them to be considered an acceptable member of society.

Southeast Asia includes the countries of Singapore, Malaysia, Indonesia, the Philippines, Laos, Thailand, Vietnam, Brunei, Cambodia, Myanmar, and East Timor. Within Southeast Asia, there is a vast spectrum of attitudes towards the LGBTQ+ community. In countries such as Thailand, Vietnam, and the Philippines, people are generally more accepting of LGBTQ+ individuals, whereas they are perceived more negatively in countries such as Indonesia and Malaysia.

A map of Southeast Asia.

== Discrimination in society ==
Same-sex sexual acts are criminalised in the Aceh province of Indonesia, South Sumatra, Malaysia, and Brunei. While they are not criminalised in other Southeast Asian countries, same-sex marriage is not legalised in any of them, except for Thailand.

While countries such as Thailand, Singapore, Vietnam, and the Philippines tend to have more accepting and positive views on gay men and lesbians, it was found that Indonesia and Malaysia had the most people with negative views in them. The study found that age was a significant contributing factor to determining whether individuals possessed negative attitudes towards gay men and lesbians. They found that older people tend to be more reluctant to be neighbours with gay men and lesbians, compared to their younger counterparts, indicating that older people tend to be less accepting towards LGBTQ+ individuals. Additionally, the study found that women, on average, tend to hold less negative views towards LGBTQ+ individuals than men do, suggesting that gender may potentially be used to predict negative views towards the LGBTQ+ community. However, age was only a significant factor in Thailand, Malaysia, Singapore, the Philippines and Indonesia, but not in Vietnam.

Conversely, some studies have shown that as negative attitudes towards queer people in Southeast Asia are not consistent - in spite of the countries sharing similar societal values - further research should be conducted to investigate what other relevant factors could contribute to the perpetuation of prejudice against the community in these specific cultures. This further shows that Southeast Asian communities are not a monolith, and that every country, as well as the people in it, have nuanced views on the LGBTQ+ community.

== Effects of discrimination on LGBTQ+ people ==
Rejection from parents and society can have a severely negative impact on the mental health of LGBTQ+ individuals.

Members of the LGBTQ+ community often receive backlash and face rejection from their families due to their identities LGBTQ+ individuals may also choose to hide their struggles with their sexuality and gender identity due to the fear of being negatively perceived by family members and peers. When faced with familial rejection, an individual's mental health is likely to deteriorate, and in worst case scenarios, might lead to children fearing for their safety even in their own homes. Familial rejection can range from words of disapproval, to threatening the child's safety, and even disowning the child. This rejection may also drive children to direct their anger inwards, leading to internalised homophobia and low self-esteem, being increasingly suicidal, or nudge them towards substance abuse. Parental support is incredibly important to the wellbeing of a child. In a survey conducted in Singapore, nearly twenty percent of participants experienced homelessness due to discord in their initial homes, which leads to financial instability and a lack of a support system.

Additionally, Toh et al. (2023) revealed that participants who experience bullying in their respective workplaces related to their sexual or gender identity were also likely to have worse mental health than those who did not undergo such an experience. On top of the daily stress that employees undergo when they go to work, LGBTQ+ individuals who face workplace bullying based on their identity are forced to deal with the negative effects of harassment, and may be unable to leave their jobs due to requiring a stable income.

In Malaysia, which is widely regarded as a conservative country, there are cases where intersectionality plays out, and religion and sexuality will overlap. Several gay Muslim men have claimed that while they continue following their religion and acknowledging the religious rules of Islam, they do not compromise their sexual identity, and instead try to strike a balance between these two important facets of their lives. This shows that they have consolidated their social identity as gay Muslim men through social influence, as well as their own perception of themselves. Growing up religious, these men have had to grapple with their attraction and come to terms with their sexuality in a non-sequential timeline. Their identities were made salient through their own self-reflection and rumination, and the interactions they had with others throughout their lives - both positive and negative. Additionally, these men have mentioned that in order to avoid negative confrontation from people who would discriminate against them or judge them for their sexual identity, they tend to be cautious when sharing details of their sexuality with others.

== Measures taken to combat discrimination ==
=== Importance of familial, professional and peer support ===
In a study, participants mentioned that having supportive friends allows them to embrace themselves more fully, and to live life to their fullest, thus improving their mental health.

=== Events in support of the LGBTQ+ community ===
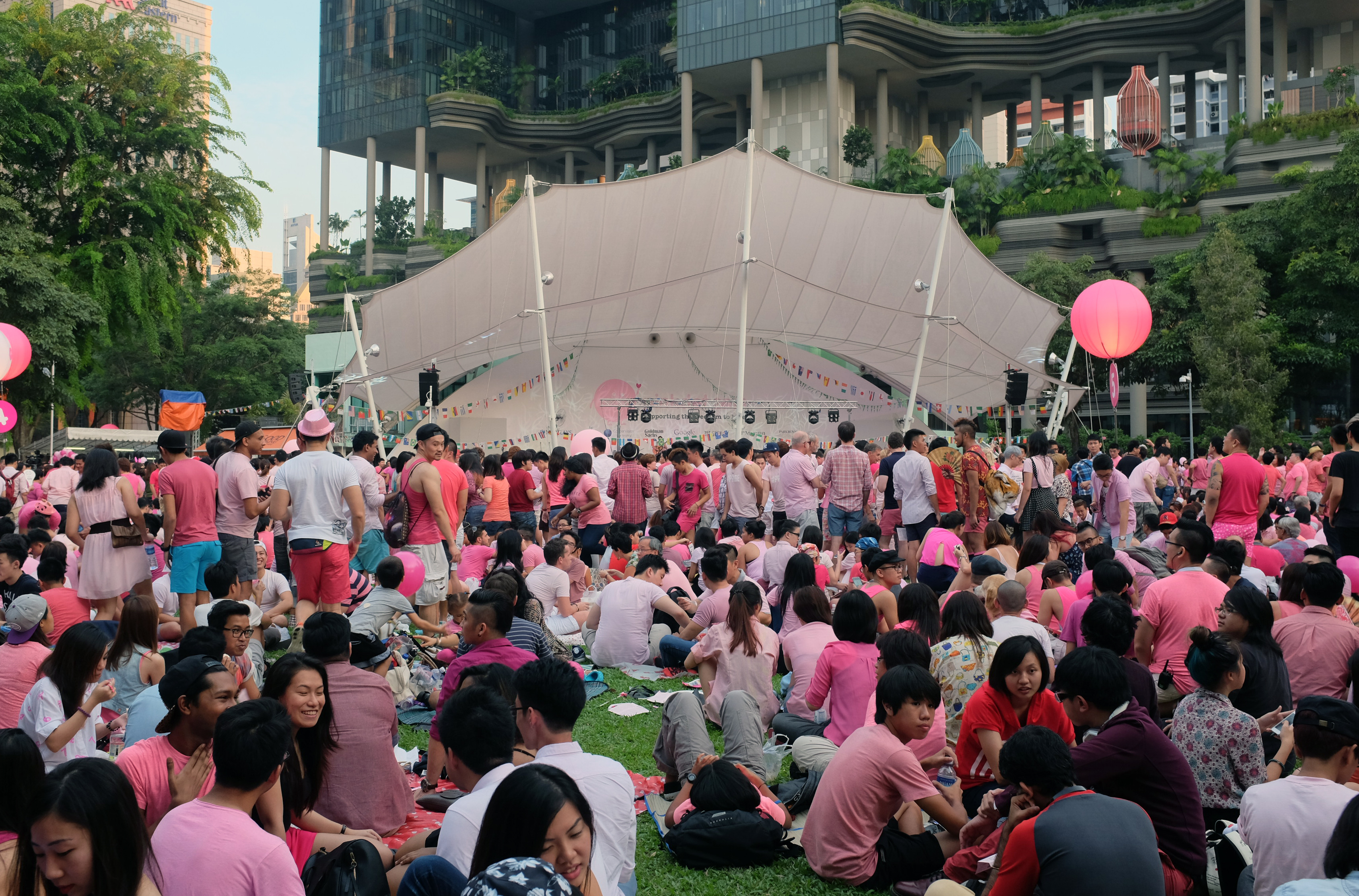
Attendees of Pink Dot SG, an annual event launched to celebrate and support the LGBTQ+ community.

In Singapore, an annual event called Pink Dot SG is held, where music performances by local queer artists are highlighted and the Singaporean LGBTQ+ community can celebrate one another.

=== Future measures ===
Studies have proposed that curating programs to raise awareness on LGBTQ+ identities, and promote acceptance, could be shown to people such as teachers, doctors, nurses, and therapists to prompt them to be more accepting towards people of the LGBTQ+ community.

== Sources ==
- Altman, Andrew (Winter 2020) [Spring 2011]. "Discrimination". In Edward N. Zalta (ed.). The Stanford Encyclopedia of Philosophy.
- Bilon, X. J.; Clemente, J. A. R. (2024). "What predicts homonegativity in Southeast Asian countries? Evidence from the world values survey". Psychology & Sexuality. 15 (4): 488–505. doi:10.1080/19419899.2023.2296591.
- Felix, M. S. (2016). "Gay identity construction of ten Muslim male undergraduates in Penang, Malaysia: A phenomenological qualitative study". Asia-Pacific Social Science Review. 16 (2): 113–119. doi:10.59588/2350-8329.1089.
- Lazar, M. M. (2017). Homonationalist discourse as a politics of pragmatic resistance in Singapore's Pink Dot movement: Towards a southern praxis. Journal of Sociolinguistics, 21(3), 420-441. https://doi.org/10.1111/josl.12239
- Manalastas, E. J.; Ojanen, T. T.; Torre, B. A.; Ratanashevorn, R.; Hong, B. C. C.; Kumaresan, V.; Veeramuthu, V. (2017). "Homonegativity in southeast Asia: Attitudes toward lesbians and gay men in Indonesia, Malaysia, the Philippines, Singapore, Thailand, and Vietnam". Asia-Pacific Social Science Review. 17 (1). doi:10.59588/2350-8329.1120.
- Mendos, L. R.; Botha, K.; Lelis, R. C.; Peña, E. L.; Savelev, I.; Tan, D. (2020). State-Sponsored Homophobia 2020: Global Legislation Overview Update (PDF) (Report). Geneva: Ilga.
- Newman, P. A.; Reid, L.; Tepjan, S.; Akkakanjanasupar, P. (2021). "LGBT+ inclusion and human rights in Thailand: a scoping review of the literature". BMC Public Health. 21 (1) 1816: 1–21. doi:10.1186/s12889-021-11798-2. PMC 8501542. PMID 34625045.
- Sopitarchasak, S. (2023). "What It Means to be a Drag Queen in Thailand: A Qualitative Study". Asia-Pacific Social Science Review. 23 (1). doi:10.59588/2350-8329.1482.
- Tan, K. K. (2022). ""We Do Not Want to Punish, We Just Want to Educate": A Scoping Review of Attitudes Towards LGBTQ Among Malaysians". Asia-Pacific Social Science Review. 22 (4). doi:10.59588/2350-8329.1478.
- Tan, K. K., & Saw, A. T. (2023). Prevalence and correlates of mental health difficulties amongst LGBTQ people in Southeast Asia: a systematic review. Journal of Gay & Lesbian Mental Health, 27(4), 401-420. https://doi.org/10.1080/19359705.2022.2089427
- Tjipto, S., Mayawati, E. H., & Bernardo, A. B. (2019). Perceived threat of homosexuals in Indonesia: Construct, measurement, and correlates. Makara Human Behavior Studies in Asia, 23(2), 181-193. 0.7454/hubs.asia.1111219
- Toh, G.W.; Koh, W.L.; Ho, J.; Chia, J.; Maulod, A.; Tirtajana, I.; Yang, P.; Lee, M. (2023). "Experiences of conflict, non-acceptance and discrimination are associated with poor mental well-being amongst LGBTQ-identified individuals in Singapore". Equality, Diversity and Inclusion. 42 (5): 625–655. doi:10.1108/EDI-10-2021-0270.
